The women's snowboard cross competition of the FIS Snowboarding World Championships 2013 was held at Stoneham-et-Tewkesbury, Québec, Canada between January 24 and 26, 2011.

The qualification round was completed on January 24, while the elimination round was completed on January 26.

Medalists

Results

Qualification

Elimination round

Quarterfinals
The top 24 qualifiers advanced to the Quarterfinals. From here, they participated in six-person elimination races, with the top three from each race advancing. 

Heat 1

Heat 2

Heat 3

Heat 4

Semifinals

Heat 1

Heat 2

Finals

Small Finals

Big Finals

References

2013 FIS Snowboard World Championships